Ramón Flores (born March 26, 1992) is a Venezuelan professional baseball outfielder for the Diablos Rojos del México of the Mexican League. He has played in Major League Baseball (MLB) for the New York Yankees, Milwaukee Brewers, and Los Angeles Angels.

Professional career

New York Yankees
The New York Yankees signed Flores as an international free agent in 2008. Flores had a .302 batting average for the Tampa Yankees of the Class A-Advanced Florida State League in 2012, and the Yankees added him to their 40-man roster after the 2012 season to protect him from the Rule 5 draft.

In the first game of the 2015 season, with the Scranton/Wilkes-Barre RailRiders of the Class AAA International League, Flores hit for the cycle.

The Yankees promoted Flores to the major leagues on May 29, 2015. On May 30, in his first major league game, he started in left field against the Oakland Athletics. The Yankees optioned Flores to Scranton/Wilkes-Barre on June 10 when Brendan Ryan was activated from the disabled list. On June 21, 2015, the Yankees called Flores back up to cover for the injured Mason Williams

Seattle Mariners
On July 30, 2015, the Yankees traded Flores and José Ramírez to the Seattle Mariners for Dustin Ackley. The Mariners assigned him to the Tacoma Rainiers of the Class AAA Pacific Coast League (PCL). Flores batted .423 in 14 games for Tacoma, before he broke and dislocated his right ankle in August, and missed the remainder of the season.

Milwaukee Brewers
On November 20, 2015, the Mariners traded Flores to the Milwaukee Brewers for Luis Sardiñas. Flores made the Brewers opening day roster after a strong spring training. On May 21, 2016, Flores homered for the first time off Jacob deGrom at Citi Field.

Los Angeles Angels
On November 15, 2016, Flores signed a minor league contract with the Los Angeles Angels organization. He played for the Salt Lake Bees of the PCL, and the Angels promoted him to the major leagues on August 1.

Boston Red Sox
On January 11, 2018, Flores signed a minor league contract with the Arizona Diamondbacks. On March 26, he was traded to the Boston Red Sox. He was released on July 4, 2018.

Somerset Patriots
On July 6, 2018, Flores signed with the Somerset Patriots of the Atlantic League of Professional Baseball. He re-signed with the team for the 2019 season.

Minnesota Twins
On July 31, 2019, Flores had his contract purchased by the Minnesota Twins and was assigned to the Triple-A Rochester Red Wings. He finished the year batting .308/.435/.449 in 30 games with Rochester. Flores did not play in a game in 2020 due to the cancellation of the minor league season because of the COVID-19 pandemic. He became a free agent on November 2, 2020.

Washington Nationals
On February 16, 2021, Flores signed a minor league contract with the Washington Nationals organization that included an invitation to spring training. Flores struggled to a .136/.278/.136 slash line with no home runs and 2 RBI in 25 games between the Double-A Harrisburg Senators and the Triple-A Rochester Red Wings and was released by the Nationals organization on July 20.

Long Island Ducks
On July 23, 2021, Flores signed with the Long Island Ducks of the Atlantic League of Professional Baseball. In 64 games, Flores batted .243/.365/.391 with 7 home runs and 36 RBIs. He became a free agent after the season.

Diablos Rojos del México
On January 9, 2022, Flores signed with the Diablos Rojos del México of the Mexican League for the 2022 season.

See also
 List of Major League Baseball players from Venezuela

References

External links

1992 births
Living people
Charleston RiverDogs players
Colorado Springs Sky Sox players
Dominican Summer League Yankees players
Venezuelan expatriate baseball players in the Dominican Republic
Gulf Coast Yankees players
Los Angeles Angels players
Major League Baseball outfielders
Major League Baseball players from Venezuela
Milwaukee Brewers players
New York Yankees players
Pawtucket Red Sox players
People from Barinas (state)
Rochester Red Wings players
Salt Lake Bees players
Scranton/Wilkes-Barre RailRiders players
Somerset Patriots players
Tacoma Rainiers players
Tampa Yankees players
Tigres de Aragua players
Trenton Thunder players
Venezuelan expatriate baseball players in the United States